Kordestan-e Bozorg (also Romanized as Kordestān-e Bozorg; also known as Kordestān-e Pā’īn, Kordestān-e Soflá, and Kordestān Soflá) is a village in Dodangeh Rural District, in the Central District of Behbahan County, Khuzestan Province, Iran. At the 2006 census, its population was 2,219, in 399 families.

References 

Populated places in Behbahan County